Christie Jean Baptiste "Kit" DeCamps (1878 – 24 August 1951) was a war veteran, civil engineer and college football player who played for the Virginia Tech Hokies football team of the Virginia Polytechnic Institute.

Early life
DeCamps was born in 1878 in Greenville, South Carolina, the son of Ghislain Modeste Decamps (1834–1896) and Mary E. Hahn (1854–1947).

Football career
DeCamps was a prominent quarterback for the Virginia Tech Hokies football team of the Virginia Polytechnic Institute. He was considered very fast. He also spent three years at Furman University and a year at Richmond College.

1901
DeCamps was captain in 1901. He was selected a substitute on the All-Southern team.

Military career
DeCamps was a quartermaster sergeant of Company B, second South Carolina regiment. DeCamps served in the Spanish–American War.

Family
On November 23, 1907, DeCamps married Lois Catherine Sykes (1881–1924), daughter of Tiberius Constantine Sykes and Alice E. Luke, in Portsmouth, Virginia. They had three children.
 Captain William Luke deCamps (July 6, 1911 – May 12, 1991), served in the 111th Field Artillery battalion of the 29th Infantry Division during Operation Overlord.
 Lois Sykes Decamps (1912–1991), married the diplomat George H. Steuart on May 28, 1938 in Wallacetown, Virginia
 Charles Decamps (1914–1991), who served in Italy during World War II

DeCamps died on August 24, 1951.

References

External links
 Kit DeCamps in Spanish–American War Retrieved 13 February 2019
 Kit CeCamps in the 1901 Edition of The Bugle Retrieved 3 August 2019

1878 births
1951 deaths
19th-century players of American football
American football quarterbacks
Virginia Tech Hokies football players
American military personnel of the Spanish–American War
People from Anderson, South Carolina
Players of American football from South Carolina